Brendan Evans and Scott Oudsema were the defending champions, but both were ineligible to compete in the juniors this year.

Jesse Levine and Michael Shabaz defeated Samuel Groth and Andrew Kennaugh in the final, 6–4, 6–1 to win the boys' doubles tennis title at the 2005 Wimbledon Championships.

Seeds

  Luis Henrique Grangeiro /  André Miele (first round)
  Timothy Neilly /  Sam Querrey (first round)
  Kim Sun-yong /  Aljoscha Thron (first round)
  Andrea Arnaboldi /  Niels Desein (first round)
  Andreas Haider-Maurer /  Dušan Lojda (first round)
  Thiemo de Bakker /  Antal van der Duim (semifinals)
  Emiliano Massa /  Leonardo Mayer (first round)
  Piero Luisi /  Ryan Sweeting (first round)

Draw

Finals

Top half

Bottom half

References

External links

Boys' Doubles
Wimbledon Championship by year – Boys' doubles